First Lady of Mali (French: Première dame du Mali) is the title held by the wife of the president of Mali, concurrent with the president's term of office. The present first lady is Lala Diallo, wife of interim President Assimi Goïta, who has held the position since May 24, 2021.

List of first ladies

See also 
 List of heads of state of Mali

References 

 
Mali